WIN 54,461 (6-Bromopravadoline) is a drug that acts as a potent and selective inverse agonist for the cannabinoid receptor CB2.

See also
 AM-630 (6-Iodopravadoline)
 WIN 48,098 (Pravadoline)
 WIN 55,212-2

References 

Cannabinoids
Aminoalkylindoles
WIN compounds
Benzoylindoles
4-Morpholinyl compunds
Organobromides